Lamb Chop's Play-Along! is a half-hour preschool children's television series that was shown on PBS in the United States from January 13, 1992 until September 22, 1995, with reruns airing on PBS until January 4, 1998, and on KTV FAVE - KIDZ 2019. It was created and hosted by puppeteer Shari Lewis, and featured her puppet characters Lamb Chop, Charlie Horse, and Hush Puppy. Lamb Chop's Play-Along! was followed by the short-lived spin-off series, The Charlie Horse Music Pizza.

Production
PBS commissioned the show from Shari Lewis in May 1991, and the show premiered in January 1992. This marked Lewis' return to television after about 15 years (following the BBC version of The Shari Lewis Show in 1975). Lamb Chop's Play-Along was shot in Canada, first in Burnaby, British Columbia and then at the CBC Studios in Vancouver, British Columbia.

The series honored Lewis' father, college professor Abraham Hurwitz (who died in 1981) - "the official magician of New York City".

Ellensburg Daily Record says: "each half hour is filled with jokes, games, songs, and tricks".

Philosophy
Shari Lewis explained her goal for the audience is "participation, not passive observance". She said: "our goal is, don't just sit there - come play with me". She wanted to "attack the shorter attention span of today's children with a fast-paced show using colorful electronic effects". She said in an interview with The Philadelphia Inquirer: "I know that when children watch TV, they go into a stupor. Parents think (their children) are interested, but what they really are is [bored]".

Lewis testified that making smart content for children was not that hard to produce and should be done with increasing frequency. She explained that if children are challenged, they will be productive members of society. She said, "I don't care if you tack a prosocial message at the end of the show. You have not done a quality show".

Synopsis
Lamb Chop is an anthropomorphic sheep; other characters are puppets of other farm animals, including Charlie Horse and Hush Puppy.

At the end of each show, Charlie Horse would try to sing "The Song That Doesn't End", much to the annoyance of Shari.

Cast
 Shari Lewis as Herself/Lamb Chop/Charlie Horse/Hush Puppy
 Pat Brymer as the head puppeteer
 Gord Robertson as Buster the Bus, featured puppeteer
 Norma McKnight as additional puppetry
 Bonnie Martin as Big Lamb Chop
 Mark Gamez as Big Charlie Horse

Lamb Chop's Playmates
 Andrew Francis
 Brian Ito
 Amanda McAdam
 Sabrina Sánchez
 Kevin Yee
 Rachel Sandor-Gough
 Talia Gilboa
 Bryan Robinson
 Zack Moses
 Phillip Boutte
 Annick Obonsawin
 John Creery
 Ramon Choyce
 Jade Schwartz
 Emma Pollard
 Maddie Lewis

Episodes
84 half-hour episodes produced.

Season 1 (1992)
 Air Charlie (4 acts) [January 13, 1992]
 Stop Biting Your Nails (4 acts) [January 14, 1992]
 Too Sick to Go to the Circus (5 acts) [January 15, 1992]
 The Bully (4 acts) [January 16, 1992]
 Hiccups (3 acts) [January 17, 1992]
 Charlie's Magic Show (2 acts) [January 20, 1992]
 Lamb Chop Works Out (4 acts) [January 21, 1992]
 The Charlie Horse Newspaper (4 acts) [January 22, 1992]
 Robin Hoof (3 acts) [January 23, 1992]
 Charlie's Toothache (4 acts) [January 24, 1992]
 The Baseball Show (3 acts) [January 27, 1992]
 The Planet Yzarc (4 acts) [January 28, 1992]
 Maurice (3 acts) [January 29, 1992]
 Charlie Horse Western (4 acts) [January 30, 1992]
 Runaway (5 acts) [January 31, 1992]
 The Lemonade Wars (4 acts) [February 3, 1992]
 Have I Got A Girl For You (4 acts) [February 4, 1992]
 The Ring (4 acts) [February 5, 1992]
 Charlie Horse's Birthday (4 acts) [February 6, 1992]
 Grown Up For A Day (4 acts) [February 7, 1992]
 Charlie Horse For Class President (4 acts) [February 10, 1992]
 Obedience School (4 acts) [February 11, 1992]
 The Necklace (4 acts) [February 12, 1992]
 The Chicken Show [February 13, 1992]
 Lamb Chop's Allowance (4 acts) [February 14, 1992]
 Talent-Less (3 acts) [February 17, 1992]
 On Thin Ice (3 acts) [February 18, 1992]
 Bigger Is Better (2 acts) [February 19, 1992]
 The Lamb Chop Show [February 20, 1992]

Season 2 (1993)
 So Long Freddy (3 acts) [February 8, 1993]
 Shari Makes a Beanstalk [February 9, 1993]
 School Daze (3 acts) [February 10, 1993]
 The Circus (1 act) [February 11, 1993]
 I'm Back! (2 acts) [February 12, 1993]
 What's Your Name? [February 15, 1993]
 Farnsworth (3 acts) [February 16, 1993]
 A Cat By Any Other Name (3 acts) [February 17, 1993]
 Born To Dance (3 acts) [February 18, 1993]
 Super Angelo (3 acts) [February 19, 1993]
 I Write The Songs (1 act) [March 8, 1993]
 United We Stand (3 acts) [March 9, 1993]
 Lucky Puppy (3 acts) [March 10, 1993]
 The Wallet (3 acts) [March 11, 1993]
 Twinkle, Twinkle (3 acts) [March 12, 1993]
 The Return of Zark (3 acts) [March 15, 1993]
 Fear of Biking (3 acts) [March 16, 1993]
 Segnorita Lamb Chop (3 acts) [March 17, 1993]
 Forget It! (3 acts) [March 18, 1993]
 Little Red Riding Hood (2 acts) [March 19, 1993]
 Chicken Pox (3 acts) [March 22, 1993]
 The Guys (3 acts) [March 23, 1993]
 Get Up & Dance [March 24, 1993]
 Trading Bases (4 acts) [March 25, 1993]
 When You Grow Up (3 acts) [March 26, 1993]
 Lamb Chop's Cold [March 29, 1993]
 Musical Chopsticks (3 acts) [March 30, 1993]
 Principal Swanson (3 acts) [March 31, 1993]
 Gold Diggers (3 acts) [April 1, 1993]
 The Emperor's New Clothes [April 2, 1993]
 Peer Pressure (3 acts) [April 5, 1993]
 Toulouse La Chop (3 acts) [April 6, 1993]
 Anchor Desk (3 acts) [April 7, 1993]
 The Dark (3 acts) [April 8, 1993]
 Lamb Chop's Lullaby [April 9, 1993]

Season 3 (1994)
 The Horse of a Different Color (2 acts) [January 31, 1994]
 Monopoly (3 acts) [February 1, 1994]
 Tattletale! (3 acts) [February 2, 1994]
 So Mad! (3 acts) [February 3, 1994]
 Lamb Chop's Pet (3 acts) [February 4, 1994]
 Togetherless (3 acts) [February 7, 1994]
 What A Mess (3 acts) [February 8, 1994]
 Buster and Butch the Bully [February 9, 1994]
 Busted-Up Buster (3 acts) [February 10, 1994]
 Lamb Chop Practicing Violin [February 11, 1994]

Season 4 (1995)
 Charlie Horse Tells a Lie (3 acts) [September 11, 1995]
 Shari's Favorite? (3 acts) [September 12, 1995]
 Lamb Chop's Art Embarrasses Charlie Horse (3 acts) [September 13, 1995]
 A Yo-Yo for Hush Puppy (3 acts) [September 14, 1995]
 Lamb Chop's Glasses (3 acts) [September 15, 1995]
 Counting on Your Knuckles [September 18, 1995]
 Your Mitt or Mine (3 acts) [September 19, 1995]
 Fighting Fair (3 acts) [September 20, 1995]
 The Job (3 acts) [September 21, 1995]
 Sea Creatures (3 acts) [September 22, 1995]

Specials
2 one-hour episode specials produced

 Special: Lamb Chop's Special Chanukah [December 17, 1995]
 Special: Shari's Passover Surprise [April 14, 1996]

Segments

Introduced in Season 1
 At Home with Lamb Chop
 Comedy Barn
 Knock! Knock!
 A Baby Lamb Chop Story
 Betcha
 Riddles
 Funny Little Poem
 Animals from the San Diego Zoo
 Tongue Twisters
 Story Time
 Sing a Little Sing-Along Song
 Playtime With Emma
 More Playtime With Emma
 A Whale Of A Tale

Introduced in Season 2
 Buster the Bus
 Alpha-Toons
 Something Unusual/Fascinating
 A Baby Shari Lewis Story
 A Teddy Bear Tale
 A Baby Hush Puppy Story
 Sing a Little Sing-Along Song

Introduced in Season 3
 Any Kid Can Draw
 Take a Look at a Book
 Buster's Brain Busters
 Magic is the Thing for You
 You Can Do It

Introduced in Season 4
 Clip from The Shari Lewis Show

Production notes
WTTW jointly distributed it with Paragon Entertainment Corporation to PBS stations across the country. The rights to the show are currently owned by Universal Television on behalf of DreamWorks Classics.

Opening and closing
Both the opening and closing songs were written by Broadway composer Norman Martin. Other songs were written by Square One TV songwriter, John Rodby. Two versions of the opening song with different lyrics have been used; one involves bouncing, the other strength. The ending theme song is "The Song That Doesn't End", as sung by the children and puppets while Lewis frantically attempts to stop them. The song eventually fades even before beginning a sixth verse. Finally, at the end of the end credits sequence, Charlie Horse returns. He tries to get to sing the song again but loses that song forever because Lewis successfully stops him (by putting her hand over his mouth). She (covering Charlie's mouth) orders him to go away and not let the song come back in her sight again. As Charlie leaves, he slams the door before Lewis could tell him to close the door properly. Despite Charlie slamming it, her only consolation is that everything is now silent (as a result of Charlie, the other puppets, and the singing group children "gone"). However, she glares at the viewers at fade-out.

An instrumental version of the show's theme song was used for a most recent show of Mallory Lewis (daughter of the show's host) and Lamb Chop.

Critical reception
The show received a rating of 8.0 based on 128 votes, at TV.com, and score of 7.8/10 at IMDb based on 407 ratings. Greensboro News & Record said of this show, "she (Lewis) made the sort of mischief that gave a vicarious thrill to millions of children watching at home".

Awards and nominations

External links

References

1992 American television series debuts
1995 American television series endings
1990s American children's television series
1992 Canadian television series debuts
1995 Canadian television series endings
1990s Canadian children's television series
American preschool education television series
American television shows featuring puppetry
Canadian preschool education television series
Canadian television shows featuring puppetry
1990s preschool education television series
English-language television shows
PBS Kids shows
PBS original programming
Television series by Universal Television
Television series by WTTW
Television shows filmed in Burnaby
Television shows filmed in Vancouver